Piestoceros is a genus of moths of the family Yponomeutidae.

Species
Piestoceros conjunctella - Walker, 1863 

Yponomeutidae